Dimethoxytrityl, often abbreviated DMT, is a protecting group widely used for protection of the 5'-hydroxy group in nucleosides, particularly in oligonucleotide synthesis.

It is usually bound to a molecule, but can exist as a stable cation in solution, where it appears bright orange.

References

Protecting groups